San Diego is a city in Duval and Jim Wells counties, Texas, United States. The population was 3,748 at the 2020 census and 4,488 at the 2010 census. It is located primarily in Duval County, of which it is the county seat.

Geography

San Diego is located at  (27.762559, –98.238771).

Demographics

2020 census

As of the 2020 United States census, there were 3,748 people, 1,390 households, and 916 families residing in the city.

2000 census
At the 2000 census there were 4,753 people, 1,548 households, and 1,187 families living in the city. The population density was 2,917.1 people per square mile (1,125.9/km2). There were 1,793 housing units at an average density of 1,100.4 per square mile (424.7/km2).  The racial makeup of the city was 78.06% White, 0.27% African American, 0.78% Native American, 0.02% Asian, 0.04% Pacific Islander, 17.72% from other races, and 3.11% from two or more races. Hispanic or Latino of any race were 96.87%.

Of the 1,548 households 40.5% had children under the age of 18 living with them, 47.3% were married couples living together, 24.4% had a female householder with no husband present, and 23.3% were non-families. 21.3% of households were one person and 11.0% were one person aged 65 or older. The average household size was 3.03 and the average family size was 3.52.

The age distribution was 32.9% under the age of 18, 9.5% from 18 to 24, 25.1% from 25 to 44, 19.4% from 45 to 64, and 13.1% 65 or older. The median age was 31 years. For every 100 females, there were 87.3 males. For every 100 females age 18 and over, there were 84.5 males.

The median household income was $19,250 and the median family income  was $25,104. Males had a median income of $21,875 versus $14,622 for females. The per capita income for the city was $9,782. About 26.8% of families and 32.2% of the population were below the poverty line, including 44.3% of those under age 18 and 26.8% of those age 65 or over.

Education
The city is served by the San Diego Independent School District and is home to the San Diego High School Vaqueros.

See also
Plan of San Diego

References

External links
History of San Diego
The colorful story of San Diego, Texas from the Corpus Christi Caller

Cities in Duval County, Texas
Cities in Jim Wells County, Texas
Cities in Texas
County seats in Texas